The Construction Industry Council (CIC) is a statutory body established on 1 February 2007 after the enactment of the Construction Industry Council Ordinance on 24 May 2006. The main functions of the CIC are to convey the industry's needs and aspirations to Government of Hong Kong, as well as provide a communication channel for Government to solicit advice on all construction-related matters.

Organisation
The CIC consists of a chairman and 24 members representing various sectors of the industry including employers, professionals, academics, contractors, workers, independent persons and Government officials.

Amalgamations
The amalgamation of the Construction Industry Council (CIC) and Construction Industry Training Academy (CITA) took place on 1 January 2008.

References

External links
 Construction Industry Council Website

Business organisations based in Hong Kong
Statutory bodies in Hong Kong